is a Japanese TV drama series. It was created by NTV and broadcast on the NNS on "" every Sunday from April 14 to September 8, 2019 at 22:30-23:25 (JST). The abbreviation is "Anaban".

 has been released since December 10, 2021.

Cast
Tomoyo Harada as Nana Tezuka
Kei Tanaka as Shōta Tezuka
Nanase Nishino as Sawa Kuroshima
Ryusei Yokohama as Shinobu Nikaidō
Tetsushi Tanaka as Masakazu Minami
Naoto Takenaka as Hiroshi Tokoshima
Tae Kimura as Sanae Enomoto
Katsuhisa Namase as Jun'ichirō Tamiya 
 as Mikiha Ono
Masanobu Ando as Gō Sano
Yoshihiko Hakamada as Yuzuru Kuzumi
Miwako Kakei as Ruri Sakuragi
Yoji Tanaka as Keisuke Ukita
Jin Katagiri as Atsushi Fujii
 as Jun Nishimura
 as Asao Hosokawa
 as Sōichi Enomoto
 as detective Masato Kamiya
Sarutoki Minagawa as detective Yōji Mizuki

References

External links

Detective television series
Television shows about death
Television series about families
Yasushi Akimoto
2019 Japanese television series debuts
Japanese drama television series
Nippon TV dramas